Han Ong (born 1968) is an American playwright and novelist. He is both a high-school dropout and one of the youngest recipients of a MacArthur Foundation "genius" grant. Born in the Philippines, he moved to the United States at 16. His works, which include the novels Fixer Chao and The Disinherited, address such themes as outsiderness, cultural conflict, and class conflict.

"I've written enough now to figure out I have a recurring tendency, which is that a lot of my characters are outsiders," Ong told a reporter after the debut of his second book,  "It comes from being an outsider twice over—my queerness and my ethnicity. I think it's a gift, though. In life it may not be a gift, but in art it is."

Background 

Han Ong was born on February 5, 1968, to ethnic Chinese parents in Manila, the Philippines. His family immigrated to the United States in 1984, and they settled in Koreatown in Los Angeles. He attended Grant High School, a predominantly white school. Ong did not share a close relationship with his four siblings, and he struggled with a sense of alienation in his new homeland as well as with his experience with adolescence. He recalled, "Puberty plus a new country—both are tough enough on their own." Thus, he found solace in books and television.

A high school drama course sparked his interest in theater.  He wrote his first play at age sixteen and was admitted to a young playwrights' lab at the Los Angeles Theater Center.  He dropped out of high school at age eighteen because he did not feel that it was beneficial; however, he earned a GED later.  Ong worked several odd jobs to support himself as he wrote, such as working in a trophy-manufacturing warehouse, until he was awarded a commission from the Mark Taper Forum and a grant from the National Endowment for the Arts.

Career accomplishments and awards 
In 1993 Ong was a winner of the Joseph Kesselring Prize for best new American plays for "Swoony Planet".

In 1994, Ong moved to New York where he received critical acclaim for his plays.  He was praised by Robert Brustein, the artistic director of the American Repertory Theater and one of the most esteemed figures of the American stage.  In 1997, at age twenty-nine, Ong was one of twenty-three winners of the prestigious MacArthur Fellowships; his grant was $200,000.  Ong said in an interview with the Washington Post's Lonnae O'Neal Parker, "I hope this MacArthur Fellowship demonstrates the importance of self-determination and the hunger for improvement for people of [my generation].  I didn't take being a [high-school] dropout as a measure of my intelligence or as a harbinger of my future."

Ong's works have been performed at venues such as the Highways Performance Space and Gallery and the Berkeley Repertory Theater in California; Joseph Papp Public Theater in New York; Portland Stage Company in Maine; Boston's American Repertory Theater; and at the Almeida Theater in London.  Ong collaborated with fellow Filipino American writer Jessica Hagedorn in 1993 to write a performance piece entitled "Airport Music" for the Los Angeles Festival.

Ong is the recipient of a Guggenheim Fellowship for Fiction and the TCG/NEA Playwriting Award. "Fixer Chao" was named a Los Angeles Times "Best Book of the Year" and was nominated for a Stephen Crane First Fiction Award. "The Disinherited" was nominated for a LAMBDA Book Award.

Although the MacArthur Foundation's Genius Grant finished in 2002, Ong continues to write despite his lamentation that he is "a little poorer now."  He has recently focused his efforts solely on novels and hopes to revisit the Philippines after more than twenty years of separation from his homeland.

Ong is a recipient of the 2010/2011 Berlin Prize Fellowship from the American Academy in Berlin.

Major themes 

Ong's works are often set in urban, multicultural settings.  His plays can be divided into two groups: those exploring the issues related to immigration (a search for roots, clashes of culture, identity crisis, American Dream) and those that examine the lives of non-stereotypical Asian Americans.  His work portrays the darker side of Asian American life.  The characters are typically depressed and hopeless.  They are alienated from society and lack mutual communication, respect, and warmth in their family lives.  This sense of alienation and outsiderness draws upon the memories of his adolescence.  Ong characterizes his work as having "a point of view of somebody with their noses pressed against the glass looking in.  It's like a jewel: you turn a different facet to the light."  Ong writes from an American perspective, but his Filipino descent is "the more concrete thing I can actually fall back on in terms of nostalgia, of identification."

Criticisms 

David Henry Hwang considers Ong as a "younger, or 'Third Wave' Asian/Pacific playwright" who refuses to focus mainly on racial issues.  The American Repertory Theater's Robert Brustein has compared Ong to Shakespeare because he is "the most exciting new talent to evolve in years" without much formal education. Writing in the New Yorker on the occasion of the world premiere production of "The L.A. Plays" at the American Repertory Theater, critic John Lahr said of Ong: "blessed with a singular theatrical voice, he's at the beginning of what is already an exciting career."  Of that play's subsequent London production at the Almeida Theater, critic Michael Billington of the Guardian wrote that Ong "has a remarkable gift for distilled dialogue and for pinning down the fragmentation, solitude and despair of the city of dreams." San Jose Mercury News theater critic Judith Green praises Ong's "Bachelor Rat" for his "deft way with words: an ability to layer poetry on reality and an unusual appreciation of irony." However, Green criticizes the depth of "Airport Music" because it is "mostly about anger, which is a good servant but a bad master." The Boston Globe's Kevin Kelly echoes these sentiments and has questioned Ong's abilities and effectiveness.  He refers to Ong as a "quick-scene dramatist" who has "brute observation, poetic sensibility, sharp characterization and cinematic skill." Kelly attacks Ong's performance as an actor (he assayed the lead in the American Repertory Theater production of "The L.A. Plays") and characterizes him as "a fussy, low-level actor who uses too many gestures and too often settles for moony passivity." It should also be pointed out that Ong has been a performance artist whose solo shows "Symposium in Manila" and "Cornerstore Geography" have drawn praise in various cities (L.A., San Francisco, New York) where they have been performed.

Bibliography

Plays 
The L.A. Plays (In a Lonely Country and A Short List of Alternate Places), 1990
Symposium in Manila, 1991
Cornerstore Geography, 1992
Bachelor Rat, 1992Reasons to Live.  Reason to Live.  Half.  No Reason, 1992Widescreen Version of the World, 1992Swoony Planet (Part One of The Suitcase Trilogy), 1993Airport Music, 1994Play of Father & Junior, 1995Autodidacts (Part Two of The Suitcase Trilogy), 1995The Chang Fragments, 1996Middle Finger, 1997Watcher, 1997Virgin (Part Three of The Suitcase Trilogy), 1997

 Novels 

 Short fiction 

StoriesThe Stranded in the World; excerpted in Charlie Chan is Dead: An Anthology of Contemporary Asian American Fiction, 1993Burden of Dreams, Zoetrope:All-Story Fall 2009Javi, 2019Futures, 2020

References

Sources
Hong, Terry.  "Genius Han Ong: The Outsider American." The Bloomsbury Review 25:1, 2005.
Liu, Miles Xian.  Asian American Playwrights: A Bio-Bibliographical Critical Sourcebook''.  Westport: Greenwood Press, 2002.
"What is a Fixer Chao?"  Yale University.  4 Nov. 2009. https://web.archive.org/web/20090419131223/http://www.yale.edu/ism/srmcon/presenter-Ong01.html

External links
Review of Fixer Chao from Salon.com
Review of The Disinherited from Time Magazine Asia
Interview with Han Ong by Jessica Hagedorn from BOMB magazine
Article about Han Ong et al from VOGUE magazine
Article about Han Ong from the Los Angeles Times

1968 births
Living people
American dramatists and playwrights of Chinese descent
American dramatists and playwrights
American gay writers
American male dramatists and playwrights
Ong,Han
American LGBT dramatists and playwrights
MacArthur Fellows
The New Yorker people